General Administration of Press and Publication (GAPP) was the administrative agency responsible for regulating and distributing news, print, and Internet publications in China. This included granting publication licenses for periodicals and books. GAPP has been under the direct control of the Central Propaganda Department of the Chinese Communist Party since 2018. The General Administration of Press and Publication was merged with the State Administration of Radio, Film, and Television to form the State Administration of Press, Publication, Radio, Film, and Television .

The agency has been satirized in the notable machinima War of Internet Addiction.

Administration
The agency is administered by a few administrators.
Director of the General Office
Sun Shoushan
Director of the National Copyright Administration
Wang Ziqiang
National Office of Crackdown on Pornographic and Illegal Publications
Li Baozhong

Internal departmental structure
The agency is organised into the following departments:

General Office
Book Publishing Management Department
Newspaper and Magazine Publishing Department
Department for the Management of Audio and Video Products and Electronic Publications
Department for the Management of Publication Distribution
Department for the Management of Printing Industry
Personnel and Education Department
External Cooperation Department
Copyright Management Department

The agency is the parent authority of the National Copyright Administration (Chinese: 国家版权局) which is responsible for copyright affairs in China.

Area of responsibilities
The agency is in charge of regulating:

New publishing houses – book, audio-visual, electronic publication, newspaper, and periodical offices
General distribution offices – for publications (including books, newspapers, periodicals, audio and video products, and electronic publications
Copyright agencies – audio and video production, electronic publication copying agencie,s and newspaper groups
Agents – dealing with imported publications
Foreign joint ventures in the news, print, and communications industry.

See also
Media of China
Publishing in China

References

External links
 

Government agencies of China
State Council of the People's Republic of China